Samuil Markovich Blekhman (15 May 191826 December 1982) was a renowned philatelist of the Soviet Union who wrote a number of notable philatelic books and articles. He was born in Moscow, was trained and worked as an engineer, and lived much of his life in Moscow.

Blekhman's works were related to postal history and postage stamps of Tuva, Mongolia, Russia and Soviet Union as well as airmail. He participated in prestigious national and international philatelic exhibitions and won a number of high-caliber awards. One of his main philatelic contributions was a detailed study of Tuva stamps and their cataloging, which was awarded the silver-plated plaquette at the World Stamp Exhibition "" and posthumously translated and published in English.

Works 
In addition to numerous Russian articles, Samuil Blekhman published his philatelic research papers in English:

See also 
 Postage stamps and postal history of Tannu Tuva
 Rossica Society of Russian Philately

References  

1918 births
1982 deaths
Philatelists
Soviet non-fiction writers
Soviet male writers
20th-century Russian male writers
Writers from Moscow
Russian Jews
Philately of the Soviet Union
Male non-fiction writers